Severino dos Ramos Durval da Silva or simply Durval (born July 11, 1980 in Cruz do Espírito Santo), is a former Brazilian central defender.

On November 13, 2012, Durval was called up, by Mano Menezes, for seleção brasileira that played the Superclásico de las Américas.

Career statistics

Club
.

Games for Brazilian team

Honours
Botafogo-PB
Campeonato Paraibano: 2003

Brasiliense
Campeonato Brasiliense: 2004

Atlético Paranaense
Campeonato Paranaense: 2005

Sport
Campeonato Pernambucano: 2006, 2007, 2008, 2009, 2014
Copa do Brasil: 2008
Copa do Nordeste: 2014

Santos
Campeonato Paulista: 2010, 2011, 2012
Copa do Brasil: 2010
Copa Libertadores: 2011
Recopa Sudamericana: 2012

References

External links

Sport Club do Recife Official Site 
CBF 

1980 births
Living people
Brazilian footballers
Brazil international footballers
Botafogo Futebol Clube (PB) players
Brasiliense Futebol Clube players
Club Athletico Paranaense players
Guarani FC players
Sport Club do Recife players
Santos FC players
Campeonato Brasileiro Série A players
Campeonato Brasileiro Série B players
Association football defenders